The 1956 North Carolina Tar Heels football team represented the University of North Carolina at Chapel Hill during the 1956 NCAA University Division football season. The Tar Heels were led by head coach Jim Tatum, who was coaching his second season for the Tar Heels, but his first since 1942. They played their home games at Kenan Memorial Stadium. The team competed as a member of the Atlantic Coast Conference, finishing in fifth. 

North Carolina was forced to forfeit its two wins and one tie from the 1956 season after it was discovered that an ineligible player had played in the first nine games of the season. Second-string end Vince Olenik had previously played football at Temple University, but was not registered with the NCAA or ACC as a transfer student. However, the ACC and NCAA now recognize North Carolina's 1956 record as 2–7–1.

Schedule

References

North Carolina
North Carolina Tar Heels football seasons
North Carolina Tar Heels football